Michael Cimino (born November 10, 1999) is an American actor. He is known for his roles as Bob Palmeri in Annabelle Comes Home and as Victor Salazar in the Hulu series Love, Victor, a spin-off of the 2018 film Love, Simon. Since 2022, he has voiced Kevin Grant-Gomez from the Disney Channel animated series Hamster & Gretel. On November 10, 2022, he released his debut EP, I'm Somewhere Out There.

Early life
Cimino was born and raised in Las Vegas, Nevada. His father is of Italian-German ancestry and his mother is of Puerto Rican descent. Cimino faced racism through elementary school, saying children would throw him on the floor and kick him, and claim he ate bugs, though he says those experiences made him more compassionate towards others. He took up acting at eight years old after joining an acting group taught by a fellow church member. Cimino graduated from high school early to get into acting more seriously and decided not to attend college.

Career
Cimino's early acting credits include a GEICO commercial and a 2016 pilot for the Nickelodeon show Hopefuls. He moved to Los Angeles when he was 18 years old. Cimino appeared in the 2019 horror film Annabelle Comes Home, playing the role of Bob Palmeri. He enjoys singing and playing guitar and had his song "Everything I Own" included on the film's soundtrack.

In August 2019, it was announced Cimino would star in the leading role as Victor in the Disney+ series Love, Victor. The show was later moved to Hulu, where it premiered in June 2020. Cimino consulted with his gay cousin to ensure the role of Victor would be a relatable and believable character.

In 2020, Cimino joined the voice cast for Black Box, a scripted science fiction podcast series.

On June 15, 2021, Cimino released his first single "Love Addict". He first previewed this song on the June 3, 2021, episode of Good Morning America.

In May 2022, Cimino joined the cast of thriller podcast series Jane Anonymous, based on the novel of the same name by Laurie Faria Stolarz.

Cimino provides the voice of Kevin in the Disney Channel animated series Hamster & Gretel. He is confirmed to star in the final season of Never Have I Ever, set to release in 2023.

Personal life
Although he played a gay character in Love, Victor, Cimino identifies as straight, although he said of his sexuality, "I don't want to put myself in a box and put myself in a position where if I were to come out as bi or as gay 10 years from now, that I was defending an identity that was being true to myself."

Filmography

Film

Television

Discography

Cimino is also a musician and has released several singles under the Cimino Sings label. He released his debut extended play on 10 November 2022.

Extended play

Singles

Singles with Finn Matthews

Soundtracks

Awards and nominations

References

External links
 

Living people
1999 births
21st-century American male actors
American male television actors
Hispanic and Latino American male actors
Male actors from Las Vegas